In mathematics, the projective unitary group  is the quotient of the unitary group  by the right multiplication of its center, embedded as scalars.
Abstractly, it is the holomorphic isometry group of complex projective space, just as the projective orthogonal group is the isometry group of real projective space.

Thus, elements of  correspond to equivalence classes of unitary matrices under multiplication by a constant phase .

Abstractly, given a Hermitian space , the group  is the image of the unitary group  in the automorphism group of the projective space .

Projective special unitary group

The projective special unitary group PSU() is equal to the projective unitary group, in contrast to the orthogonal case.

The connections between the U(), SU(), their centers, and the projective unitary groups is shown at right.

The center of the special unitary group is the scalar matrices of the th roots of unity:

The natural map

is an isomorphism, by the second isomorphism theorem, thus

and the special unitary group SU() is an -fold cover of the projective unitary group.

Examples
At n = 1, U(1) is abelian and so is equal to its center. Therefore PU(1) = U(1)/U(1) is a trivial group.

At n = 2, all being representable by unit norm quaternions, and  via:

Finite fields

For convenience, this article uses the  convention.

The topology of PU(H)

PU(H) is a classifying space for circle bundles

The same construction may be applied to matrices acting on an infinite-dimensional Hilbert space .

Let U(H) denote the space of unitary operators on an infinite-dimensional Hilbert space. When f: X → U(H) is a continuous mapping of a compact space X into the unitary group, one can use a finite dimensional approximation of its image and a simple K-theoretic trick

to show that it is actually homotopic to the trivial map onto a single point. This means that U(H) is weakly contractible, and an additional argument shows that it is actually contractible. Note that this is a purely infinite dimensional phenomenon, in contrast to the finite-dimensional cousins U(n) and their limit U(∞) under the inclusion maps which are not contractible admitting homotopically nontrivial continuous mappings onto U(1) given by the determinant of matrices.

The center of the infinite-dimensional unitary group  is, as in the finite dimensional case, U(1), which again acts on the unitary group via multiplication by a phase. As the unitary group does not contain the zero matrix, this action is free. Thus  is a contractible space with a U(1) action, which identifies it as EU(1) and the space of U(1) orbits as BU(1), the classifying space for U(1).

The homotopy and (co)homology of PU(H)

In particular, using the isomorphism

between the homotopy groups of a space X and the homotopy groups of its classifying space BX, combined with the homotopy type of the circle U(1)

we find the homotopy groups of 

thus identifying  as a representative of the Eilenberg–MacLane space K(Z, 2).

As a consequence,  must be of the same homotopy type as the infinite-dimensional complex projective space, which also represents K(Z, 2). This means in particular that they have isomorphic homology and cohomology groups:

Representations

The adjoint representation
PU(n) in general has no n-dimensional representations, just as SO(3) has no two-dimensional representations.

PU(n) has an adjoint action on SU(n), thus it has an -dimensional representation. When n = 2 this corresponds to the three dimensional representation of SO(3). The adjoint action is defined by thinking of an element of PU(n) as an equivalence class of elements of U(n) that differ by phases. One can then take the adjoint action with respect to any of these U(n) representatives, and the phases commute with everything and so cancel. Thus the action is independent of the choice of representative and so it is well-defined.

Projective representations
In many applications PU(n) does not act in any linear representation, but instead in a projective representation, which is a representation up to a phase which is independent of the vector on which one acts. These are useful in quantum mechanics, as physical states are only defined up to phase. For example, massive fermionic states transform under a projective representation but not under a representation of the little group PU(2) = SO(3).

The projective representations of a group are classified by its second integral cohomology, which in this case is

 

or 

The cohomology groups in the finite case can be derived from the long exact sequence for bundles and the above fact that SU(n) is a Z/n bundle over PU(n). The cohomology in the infinite case was argued above from the isomorphism with the cohomology of the infinite complex projective space.

Thus PU(n) enjoys n projective representations, of which the first is the fundamental representation of its SU(n) cover, while  has a countably infinite number. As usual, the projective representations of a group are ordinary representations of a central extension of the group. In this case the central extended group corresponding to the first projective representation of each projective unitary group is just the original unitary group of which we took the quotient by U(1) in the definition of PU.

Applications

Twisted K-theory
The adjoint action of the infinite projective unitary group is useful in geometric definitions of twisted K-theory. Here the adjoint action of the infinite-dimensional  on either the Fredholm operators or the infinite unitary group is used.

As seen below, topologically  represents the Eilenberg–Maclane space K(Z, 2), therefore the classifying space of  bundles is the Eilenberg–Maclane space K(Z, 3). K(Z, 3) is also the classifying space for the third integral cohomology group, therefore  bundles are classified by the third integral cohomology. As a result, the possible twists H of a twisted K-theory are precisely the elements of the third integral cohomology.

Pure Yang–Mills gauge theory
In the pure Yang–Mills SU(n) gauge theory, which is a gauge theory with only gluons and no fundamental matter, all fields transform in the adjoint of the gauge group SU(n). The Z/n center of SU(n) commutes, being in the center, with SU(n)-valued fields and so the adjoint action of the center is trivial. Therefore the gauge symmetry is the quotient of SU(n) by Z/n, which is PU(n) and it acts on fields using the adjoint action described above.

In this context, the distinction between SU(n) and PU(n) has an important physical consequence. SU(n) is simply connected, but the fundamental group of PU(n) is Z/n, the cyclic group of order n. Therefore a PU(n) gauge theory with adjoint scalars will have nontrivial codimension 2 vortices in which the expectation values of the scalars wind around PU(n)'s nontrivial cycle as one encircles the vortex. These vortices, therefore, also have charges in Z/n, which implies that they attract each other and when n come into contact they annihilate. An example of such a vortex is the Douglas–Shenker string in SU(n) Seiberg–Witten gauge theories.

References

See also
Unitary group
Special unitary group
Unitary operators
Projective orthogonal group

Lie groups